Cynthia Grover is an American actress.

She played Lucy in Jaws 2 (1978), and Elaine in The Silence (1975). She played Eve in the TV episode 'A Puzzle for Prophets', from Mrs. Columbo (1979) along Francine Tacker, Joe Ruskin, and Richard Altman; and Linda in Family along Cliff De Young and Louise Foley.

Filmography
 The Choice (1981) as Joan
 Family (1980) as Linda Robertson
 Hart to Hart (1980) as Ella Greber
 Mrs. Columbo (1979) as Eve
 Married: The First Year (1979) as Joanna Huffman Baker
 Jaws 2 (1978) as Lucy
 Network (1976) as Caroline Schumacher
 The Silence (1975) as Elaine
 Andy (1965)
 Love of Life (1951) as Stacy Corby

References

External links
 
 
 

20th-century American actresses
American film actresses
American soap opera actresses
American child actresses